The 2022–23 NCAA Division I men's ice hockey season is the 129th season of play for varsity ice hockey in the United States. The regular season is set to begin on October 1, 2022 and conclude on March 11, 2023. Two programs are playing their first Division I games this season while a third is restarting its program.

Season
After a successful, multi-million dollar fundraising effort, Alaska Anchorage restated its ice hockey program in time for the 2022–23 season.

After playing at the lower level of college hockey for over 40 years, Stonehill was promoted to Division I along with all of the varsity programs at their school. Due to the late announcement, however, the majority of teams that populate the Skyhawks' schedule are from the Division III and II levels.

The independent ranks also welcomed Lindenwood in its first varsity season. The Lions had played at the club level since 2003 and are 4-time national club champions.

Coaches
As part of the Seawolves' renewal, Alaska Anchorage brought in Matt Shasby to be the program's new head coach.

Records

* Only varsity seasons are included.

Standings

Statistics

NCAA tournament

Ranking

USCHO

USA Today

Pairwise

Note: teams ranked in the top-10 automatically qualify for the NCAA tournament. Teams ranked 11-16 can qualify based upon conference tournament results.
Note: On February 1, the NCAA selection committee removed all Stonehill games from tournament consideration.

References

External links

2022–23
Independent
2022–23